El Hijo de la calle is a 1949 Argentine film.

Cast
 Toscanito as Andresito Pérez
 Carmen Valdez as the mother
 Florén Delbene as Eduardo
 María Concepción César 
 Guillermo Battaglia as the vagabond
 Guillermo Pedemonte as the doctor
 Alberto Rinaldi as the friend
 Narciso Ibáñez as the porter
 Raúl Roa as the official
 Arturo Arcari

External links
 

1949 films
1940s Spanish-language films
Argentine black-and-white films
Argentine drama films
1949 drama films
1940s Argentine films
Films directed by Leopoldo Torres Ríos